Alvinnn!!! and the Chipmunks (also stylized ALVINNN!!! and the Chipmunks) is a computer-animated  television series created by Janice Karman. Produced by Bagdasarian Productions and Technicolor Animation Productions with the participation of M6, it features Alvin and the Chipmunks and The Chipettes and marks their first television appearance together since 1990. First announced by Bagdasarian Productions in 2010, a promotional trailer for the series was posted on YouTube.

Animation and half of the show's storyboards are handled by Technicolor Productions in France, while Bagdasarian Productions in the U.S. is in charge of voice recording and music production. The series is primarily distributed by PGS Entertainment, a French brand management company. It premiered on M6 on March 30, 2015. In August 2015, Nickelodeon acquired the American broadcast rights to the series.

Plot
Simulating an anthology of a famous band, songwriter David Seville is raising platinum recording groups The Chipmunks and Chipettes (Alvin, Simon, Theodore, Brittany, Jeanette and Eleanor, though part time for the Chipettes). Dave's patience is tested everyday, but despite all of this, he loves the entire band like his own family. The series takes place in modern society and discusses modern topics such as Dave's technology issues. Others are parents embarrassing kids and parents needing dates.

Voice cast
Ross Bagdasarian Jr. as Alvin Seville, Simon Seville, and Dave Seville.
Janice Karman as Theodore Seville, Brittany Miller, Jeanette Miller, Kevin, Miss Bernese Smith, Miss Croner, Miss Beatrice Miller, and additional voices.
Vanessa Bagdasarian as Eleanor Miller, Lucy, Kate, Amber, Annie, and additional voices.
Michael Bagdasarian as Mr. Meadows, Cheesy, Officer Dangus, and additional voices.
Jean Ellie as Biggie Large.
Brian Chambers as Derek Smalls and additional voices.
Edwina Jones as Principal Meadows.
Elizabeth Gomez as Julie.

Production
The series, originally titled The Chipmunks and Chipettes, has 104 11-minute episodes and is produced in high-definition CGI animation, with The Chipmunks and The Chipettes' new looks resembling the iMunk looks. The show serves as an update of the 1980s series utilizing the same theme song, voice actors, Ross Bagdasarian, Jr. and Janice Karman, and format with each episode having a song.

The series producers are Ross Bagdasarian, Jr., Janice Karman, Sandrine Nguyen, and Boris Hertzog from the American production company Bagdasarian Productions and French company OuiDo! Productions. OuiDo! Productions (now Technicolor Animation Productions) handles the animation and storyboards, with Bagdasarian Productions in charge of voices and music. PGS Entertainment acquired the rights for media outside the United States and France in August 2013 and licensing and merchandising rights in May 2014. On February 24, 2014, Nickelodeon acquired all 104 episodes for all territories except Brazil. It originally also excluded North America, but this was later changed. The series was put on sale at the October 2013 Mipcom and was one of the most-viewed shows there.

In October 2016, the series was renewed for a third and fourth season. In late 2018, the series was renewed for a fifth season. On November 6, 2019, the series was renewed for a sixth and seventh season.

Episodes

Broadcast
The series made its English-language debut on Nicktoons in the United Kingdom and Ireland on March 5, 2015 and on Nickelodeon in the United States on August 3. Nicktoons in Africa premiered the show on May 4. The Southeast Asian feed of Nickelodeon debuted the show on May 8 in Singapore and the Philippines and on May 15 in Malaysia. In Brazil, the series premiered on June 15 on Gloob. In English-speaking Canada, it premiered on Teletoon on September 9 and was moved to Family Channel on May 6, 2017. In Arabia, it is currently on Nicktoons and Spacetoon It is now airing on Pop in the U.K. on February 1, 2016. In Indonesia, it is currently airing on MNCTV. In June 2018, it was announced that ALVINNN!!! and the Chipmunks would stream on Hulu. On November 1, 2018 the series premiered on eToonz in South Africa. In July 2020 it aired on Disney Channel in Spain. On September 27, 2021, the show premiered on Disney Channel in Japan.

Home video
Season 1 Vol. 1 was released on DVD on December 4, 2015. Season 1 Vol. 2 was released on January 26, 2016. Alvin's Wild Adventures was released on DVD and Blu-ray on November 10, 2015 by Bagdasarian Productions. It contains the episodes "Principal Interest", "Talking Teddy", "Mystic Mountain", "A is for Alien", "Clowning Around", "Driving Dave Crazy", and "What a Gem". Alvin vs. Brittany was released on DVD and Blu-Ray on March 1, 2016 by Bagdasarian Productions. It contains the episodes "Sister Act", "Albrittina", "My Sister the Weirdo", "Mister Manners", "Reality or Not", "Turf War", and "Don Juan Theodoro".

Soundtracks
On September 25, 2015, an album based on the television series was released on iTunes, Google Play, Amazon, and CD entitled We're the Chipmunks (Music from the TV Show). On September 22, 2017, a second album based on the series was released on iTunes and Spotify entitled Nuts 2 U. On August 30, 2019, a third album based on the series as released on iTunes and Spotify entitled YOLO.

References

External links

 ALVINNN!!! and the Chipmunks on Ouido Productions
 ALVINNN!!! and the Chipmunks on Bagdasarian Productions
 ALVINNN!!! and the Chipmunks on M6
 ALVINNN!!! and the Chipmunks on PGS Entertainment
 ALVINNN!!! and the Chipmunks on Nickelodeon
 

Alvin and the Chipmunks
2010s American animated television series
2020s American animated television series
2010s American musical comedy television series
2020s American musical comedy television series
2010s Nickelodeon original programming
2020s Nickelodeon original programming
2015 American television series debuts
2023 American television series endings
2010s French animated television series
2020s French animated television series
2015 French television series debuts
Animated television series reboots
American children's animated comedy television series
American children's animated musical television series
American computer-animated television series
Animated television series about brothers
Animated television series about children
Animated television series about mammals
English-language television shows
French children's animated comedy television series
French children's animated musical television series
French computer-animated television series
Nickelodeon original programming
Television series created by Janice Karman